Ficus cyclophylla is a species of fig tree in the family Moraceae, native to Brazil.

It is endemic to the Atlantic Forest ecoregion of Southeast Brazil, in the states of Maranhão, Minas Gerais, Paraíba, Pernambuco, Rio de Janeiro, and Rondônia. It is also found on the Fernando de Noronha islands of Pernambuco.

It is an IUCN Red List Endangered species. threatened by habitat loss.

See also

References

Sources

cyclophylla
Endemic flora of Brazil
Flora of the Atlantic Forest
Flora of Minas Gerais
Flora of Paraíba
Flora of Pernambuco
Flora of Rio de Janeiro (state)
Fernando de Noronha
Trees of Brazil
Endangered flora of South America
Taxonomy articles created by Polbot
Taxa named by Friedrich Anton Wilhelm Miquel